Just 4 Fun may refer to:

 Just 4 Fun (band), a Norwegian band, active in the early 1990s
 Just 4 Fun (TV program), an Australian children's show, on air from 1976 to 1978
 Just 4 Fun (board game), a German board game

See also
 Just for Fun (disambiguation)
 4Fun, a Lithuanian band, active since 2001
 4 Fun, a Dutch boy band, active from 1997 to 1998